InterCity East Coast is a railway franchise for passenger trains on the East Coast Main Line in the United Kingdom from London King's Cross to Hull, Leeds, Bradford, Harrogate, Newcastle, Edinburgh, Glasgow, Inverness and Aberdeen. It was formed during the privatisation of British Rail and transferred to the private sector in April 1996.

Initially operated by Great North Eastern Railway (GNER), it was later operated by National Express East Coast, East Coast and Virgin Trains East Coast. In June 2018 the franchise was terminated and the trains and stations taken back into public ownership; since then, services are provided by London North Eastern Railway (LNER), a company owned by the Department for Transport.

History

Great North Eastern Railway

In April 1996, Sea Containers, operating under the GNER brand, commenced a seven-year contract to operate the franchise.

In March 2000, the Shadow Strategic Rail Authority (SRA) shortlisted Sea Containers and Virgin Rail Group to bid for the next franchise. The franchise was to be for 20 years and included proposals for new trains and replacements of sections of track. In January 2002, the SRA scrapped the refranchising process and awarded a two-year extension to Sea Containers until April 2005.

In October 2004, the SRA issued an Invitation to Tender for the next franchise to the four shortlisted bidders, Danish State Railways/English Welsh & Scottish, FirstGroup, GNER and Virgin Rail Group.  In March 2005, the franchise was awarded to GNER for seven years, with a three-year extension based on targets being met, starting on 1 May 2005. GNER committed to pay a £1.3 billion premium to the Department for Transport (DfT) over ten years.

However, due to the financial problems caused by it having overbid as well as financial difficulties encountered by the parent company, in December 2006 the government announced it was stripping the franchise from Sea Containers and would put it up for re-tender, with GNER running the franchise on fixed fee management contract in the interim.

National Express East Coast
In February 2007, the DfT announced Arriva, FirstGroup, National Express and Virgin Rail Group had been shortlisted to lodge bids for the franchise. In April 2007, it was announced that GNER had a 10% stake in the Virgin Rail Group bid. In August 2007 the franchise was awarded to National Express, and GNER's services transferred to National Express East Coast (NXEC) on 9 December 2007.

By 2009, NXEC was under increasing financial pressure due to rising fuel prices and the economic downturn. Instead of projected increases in revenue from the franchise, in the first half of 2009 NXEC ticket sales income decreased by 1%. In April 2009, National Express confirmed that it was still pursuing talks with the government over possible financial assistance with the franchise, either through a reduction in the premium due, or other assistance.

In July 2009, National Express announced it planned to default on the franchise, having failed to renegotiate the contractual terms of operation, and would not provide any further funding. This meant NXEC would run out of cash by the end of 2009. As a result, the DfT announced it would re-nationalise the franchise.

East Coast Main Line Company

The franchise was re-nationalised on 14 November 2009 with Directly Operated Railways' subsidiary East Coast taking over, with the intention being that operations would return to a private franchisee by December 2013. In March 2013, the Secretary of State for Transport announced that this would be put back to February 2015.

Virgin Trains East Coast

In January 2014, FirstGroup, Keolis/Eurostar International Limited (EIL) and Stagecoach/Virgin were announced as the shortlisted bidders for the new franchise. In November 2014, the franchise was awarded to Stagecoach/Virgin, who trading as Virgin Trains East Coast (VTEC) commenced operating the franchise on 1 March 2015.

In November 2017 Secretary of State for Transport Chris Grayling announced the early termination of the East Coast franchise in 2020, three years ahead of schedule, following losses on the route by the operator. Virgin Trains East Coast had been due to pay more than £2 billion in franchise premiums to the government over the last four years of its contract.

Secretary Grayling claimed the losses were due to VTEC simply overestimating future growth in passenger revenue in its bid calculations, meaning franchise payments due to the government exceeded the profits being returned by running the services, while others believe the delays in state owned Network Rail delivering expected infrastructure upgrades meant the company could not operate the increased number of services needed to generate this increased revenue.

Termination was brought forward in February 2018 to June 2018.

London North Eastern Railway
On 16 May 2018, Secretary of State for Transport Chris Grayling announced the franchise would be terminated on 24 June 2018 and renationalised. A partnership of Arup Group, Ernst & Young, and SNC-Lavalin Rail & Transit provided assistance to the government in their preparation to take control of the franchise from VTEC and it is currently operated by DOHL, a wholly-owned subsidiary of the Department of Transport.

Rolling stock
At inception the franchise inherited a fleet operated a fleet of InterCity 125 and InterCity 225 trains. These were refurbished with new interiors in the mid-2000s, the former of which were retired in December 2019, the latter were due to be retired in 2020. All to be replaced by Class 800/801s.  It was announced in February 2020 that LNER will retain a number of Class 91s and Mk 4s to enable it to meet December 2021 timetable requirements.

References

East Coast Main Line
Railway franchises in the United Kingdom